Anagelasta is a genus of longhorn beetles of the subfamily Lamiinae, containing the following species:

subgenus Anagelasta
 Anagelasta apicalis Pic, 1925
 Anagelasta grisea Breuning, 1936
 Anagelasta lineifrons Gressitt, 1951

subgenus Mesagelasta
 Anagelasta nigromaculata Breuning, 1938
 Anagelasta transversevittata Breuning, 1964
 Anagelasta trimaculata Breuning, 1938

References

Mesosini
Cerambycidae genera